Carl Waldemar Walter (1905 – May 5, 1992) was a surgeon, inventor, and professor at Harvard Medical School. Walter has been called "a pioneer in the transfusion and storage of blood," credited with founding one of the world's first blood banks and invention of the first blood collection bag. He was also known for his prolific work in the advocacy, application, and study of asepsis.

Career 
From 1937 to 1972, Walter was the Clinical Professor of Surgery at Harvard Medical School.

References 

 New York Times:Dr. Carl W. Walter, an Inventor Of Medical Equipment, Dies at 86;By BRUCE LAMBERT; May 09, 1992
 
 harvard
 harvard bulletin

External links 

 Carl W. Walter papers, 1933-1992, 1996 (inclusive). H MS c150. Harvard Medical Library, Francis A. Countway Library of Medicine, Boston, Mass.

1905 births
1992 deaths
American surgeons
Harvard Medical School faculty
Physicians from Cleveland
20th-century American physicians
20th-century American inventors
20th-century surgeons
Harvard College alumni
Harvard Medical School alumni